Fengite is a translucent sheet of marble or alabaster used during the Early Middle Ages for windows instead of glass.

Notes

Minerals
Alabaster